A.S.P. Air Strike Patrol is an isometric shoot 'em up developed by Japanese studio Opus and published by SETA for the SNES.

Gameplay 

For the gameplay, it's similar to Strike. The game is based somewhat upon the Gulf War. As a pilot in the Air Strike Patrol, the player's aim is to stop Zarak (Iraq) from invading Sweit (Kuwait). The player gains points for judgement in managing resources, attack power and political sensitivity. The total of these determines which text is displayed when the game is finished. The dogfights make the game more diverse and the cheat options, e.g. ability to destroy buildings with the chain gun, give variety. There are many optional targets to destroy on the open map, too, but take too long and you fail the mission.

Development and release

Reception 

A.S.P. Air Strike Patrol was generally well received by critics and reviewers alike since its release.

Notes

References

External links 
 A.S.P. Air Strike Patrol at GameFAQs
 A.S.P. Air Strike Patrol at Giant Bomb
 A.S.P. Air Strike Patrol at MobyGames

1994 video games
Gulf War video games
Scrolling shooters
SETA Corporation games
Super Nintendo Entertainment System games
Super Nintendo Entertainment System-only games
Video games developed in Japan
Single-player video games